Boris Aleksandrovich Chernyshov (born 25 June 1991, in Voronezh) is a Russian politician, a deputy of the 7th State Duma of the Russian Federation.

Biography

Education
Chernyshov graduated from the National Research University Higher School of Economics in 2012, and completed further studies at Moscow State University (2014).

Early career
Prior to election to the State Duma, Chernyshov was coordinator of the Moscow branch of the Liberal Democratic Party of Russia (LDPR). In this role, he organized a public protest in front of the Turkish Embassy against the 2015 Russian Sukhoi Su-24 shootdown by a Turkish Air Force F-16 fighter jet.

State Duma of the Russian Federation
In 2016, Chernyshov was elected as a deputy in the State Duma, the lower house of the Federal Assembly of Russia. He is a representative for the Orekhovo–Borisovo constituency in Moscow. His first day in office was September 18, 2016. He is also the Deputy Chairman of the Committee on Education and Science.

Chernyshov drafted two bills in November 2016 to regulate electronic cigarettes. He proposed banning sales to minors, prohibiting vaping in certain public areas such as parks, and creating regulations to avoid harmful ingredients.

In November 2016, Chernyshov and fellow LDPR deputy Vasily Vlasov prepared a bill to lower the voting age in Russia from 18 to 16. This has been a policy of the LDPR since 2014, reflecting the popularity of the party among young people. However, the bill was swiftly rejected by the Russian government. Following this, Chernyshov and Vlasov advanced the idea of lowering the minimum age of LDPR membership to 16 years. Chernyshov suggested that membership of the LDPR by young people might motivate other family members and friends to also join the party.

On 24 March 2022, the United States Treasury sanctioned him in response to the 2022 Russian invasion of Ukraine.

References 

1991 births
Living people
People from Voronezh
Liberal Democratic Party of Russia politicians
Seventh convocation members of the State Duma (Russian Federation)
Moscow State University alumni
Eighth convocation members of the State Duma (Russian Federation)
Higher School of Economics alumni
Russian individuals subject to the U.S. Department of the Treasury sanctions